Tommy Vásquez (born February 3, 1981 in Bogotá, Colombia), is Colombian actor.

Filmography

Films

Television

Awards and nominations

References

External links 

1981 births
Male actors from Bogotá
Colombian male film actors
Colombian male telenovela actors
21st-century Colombian male actors
Living people